The 1983 World Junior Ice Hockey Championships (1983 WJHC) was the seventh edition of the Ice Hockey World Junior Championship and was held in Leningrad, Soviet Union between December 26, 1982, and January 4, 1983.  The host Soviet team won the tournament with a perfect 7–0 record.

Pool A
The tournament was a round-robin format, with the top three teams winning gold, silver and bronze medals respectively.

Final standings

 was relegated to Pool B for the 1984 World Junior Ice Hockey Championships.

Results

Scoring leaders

Tournament awards

Pool B
The second tier was contested from March 14 to 20, in Anglet, France.  Eight teams were divided into two round robin groups where the top two, and bottom two, graduated to meet their respective opponents in a final round robin.  Results between competitors who migrated together were carried forward.

Preliminary round

Group A

Group B

Relegation round
Results from any games played during the preliminary round were carried forward to the relegation round.

 was relegated to Pool C for the 1984 World Junior Ice Hockey Championships.

Promotion round
Results from any games played during the preliminary round were carried forward to the promotion round.

 was promoted to Pool A for the 1984 World Junior Ice Hockey Championships.

Scoring leaders

Pool C
A double round robin (each team played each other twice) was played in Bucharest, Romania from March 3 to 9.  This was the first year of a 'C' pool, and it marked the debut of junior teams from Romania, Bulgaria, and Australia.

 was promoted to Pool B for the 1984 World Junior Ice Hockey Championships.

References

Results at passionhockey.com
Full player statistics at eliteprospects.com

World Junior Ice Hockey Championships
World Junior Ice Hockey Championships
World Junior Ice Hockey Championships
World Junior Ice Hockey Championships
World Junior Ice Hockey Championships
World Junior Ice Hockey Championships
December 1982 sports events in Europe
International ice hockey competitions hosted by France
International ice hockey competitions hosted by Romania
International ice hockey competitions hosted by the Soviet Union
January 1983 sports events in Europe
March 1983 sports events in Europe
Sports competitions in Bucharest
Sports competitions in Saint Petersburg
World Junior Ice Hockey Championships